5 Colori is the first studio album wrote by Italian jazz musician Marco Di Meco, released on July 10, 2014, by Wide Sound.

Track listing

Musicians 

Per the liner notes
 Marco Di Meco — flute
 Andrea Conti — electric guitar 
 Fabiano Di Dio — piano, rhodes
 Emanuele Di Teodoro — electric bass 
 Andrea Ciaccio — drums

External links
 https://www.discogs.com/it/Marco-Di-Meco-5-Colori/release/8221330
 https://web.archive.org/web/20160309095818/http://151.236.46.98/ird/?q=node%2F310103
 http://ricerca.gelocal.it/ilcentro/archivio/ilcentro/2015/08/14/teramo-jazz-e-arte-a-torre-cerrano-29.html

2014 albums